Warndarang is an alternative spelling of Warndarrang. It may refer to:

Warndarrang people
Warndarrang language